Ninomiya (written: 二宮 or 二ノ宮 lit. "second shrine") may refer to:

Places 
 Ninomiya, Kanagawa
 Ninomiya, Tochigi
 Ninomiya Station

Other uses 
 Ninomiya (shrine), a classification of Shinto shrine
 Ninomiya (surname)

See also 
 Noto-Ninomiya Station 
 Hōtoku Ninomiya Shrine, Japanese Shinto shrine in Odawara, Kanagawa dedicated to Ninomiya Sontoku